Eglaine Parish is an administrative unit of Augšdaugava Municipality in the Selonia region of Latvia.

Villages 
 Annasmuiža
 Baltmuiža
 Eglaine
 Laši
 Vitkuški

See also 
 Gotthard Friedrich Stender

References 

Parishes of Latvia
Augšdaugava Municipality
Selonia